The 61st General Assembly of Prince Edward Island was in session from May 11, 2000 to September 2, 2003. The Progressive Conservative Party led by Pat Binns formed the government.

Mildred Dover was elected speaker.

There were four sessions of the 61st General Assembly:

Members

Notes:

References 
 Election results for the Prince Edward Island Legislative Assembly, 2000-04-17
 Mars-Proietti, Laura Canadian Parliamentary Guide, 2008 

Terms of the General Assembly of Prince Edward Island
2000 establishments in Prince Edward Island
2003 disestablishments in Prince Edward Island